Automeris zozine is a moth of the family Saturniidae. It is found in Mexico, south to Guatemala and Colombia.

The wingspan is about 65 mm.

The larvae feed on Quercus and Robinia species.

External links
Moths of Belize

Hemileucinae
Moths described in 1886
Moths of North America
Moths of South America